Zalqi (also Romanized as Zalqī) is a village in Hendijan-e Sharqi Rural District, in the Central District of Hendijan County, Khuzestan Province, Iran. At the 2006 census, its population was 242, in 48 families.

References 

Populated places in Hendijan County